Narayanan Janani (born 28 April 1985) is an Indian cricket umpire. She is currently a member of Development Panel of ICC Umpires. In January 2023, she was one of the female umpires named by the ICC to stand in matches in the 2023 ICC Women's T20 World Cup.

On 10 January 2023, she along with Vrinda Rathi became the first woman umpires to stand as an on-field umpire in a men's domestic fixture in India, when she was one of the umpires in the match between Tripura and Railways in the 2022-23 Ranji Trophy.

See also
 List of Twenty20 International cricket umpires
 List of One Day International cricket umpires

References

External links
 

1985 births
Living people
Women cricket umpires
Indian cricket umpires
Indian Twenty20 International cricket umpires
Indian One Day International cricket umpires